Alfred A. Knopf, Inc. is a New York publishing house that was founded by Alfred A. Knopf Sr. in 1915. This is a list of authors published by Alfred A. Knopf.

A 

 Kōbō Abe, famous Japanese writer
 Leonard J. Arrington, American historian

B 

 John Banville, Irish writer
 Carl Bernstein, American journalist
 Elizabeth Bowen, Irish writer
 Frederick Buechner, American author
Richard Bushman, American historian
 Witter Bynner, American author

C 

 James M. Cain, American author and journalist
 Albert Camus, French author and journalist
 Robert Caro, American journalist and author
 Willa Cather, American writer and novelist
 Raymond Chandler, American novelist and screenwriter
 Julia Child, American chef and cookbook author
 Bill Clinton, 42nd President of the United States

D 

 Floyd Dell, novelist, poet, playwright, critic, editor
 Joan Didion, American writer

E 

 T. S. Eliot, English author
 Bret Easton Ellis, American novelist
 James Ellroy, novelist and writer

F 

 Gustave Flaubert, French writer
 Barbara Newhall Follett, American child writer

G 

 Martin Gardner, American writer
 Théophile Gautier, French writer
 Kahlil Gibran, Lebanese artist, poet, and writer
 Maxim Gorky, Russian writer
 Robert Graves, English poet and novelist

H 

 Lee H. Hamilton, politician
 Dashiell Hammett, American writer
 Joseph Hergesheimer, novelist, short-story writer 
 John Hersey, American journalist, novelist and professor
 Carl Hiaasen, American author
Langston Hughes, American writer and social activist

I 

 Kazuo Ishiguro, Japanese-born British writer

K 

 John Keegan, British military historian and writer

L 

 Nella Larsen, novelist and librarian
 Wyndham Lewis, English painter, writer and critic
 Jack London, American author and journalist

M 

 Ross Macdonald, Canadian novelist
 Thomas Mann, German novelist and 1929 Nobel Prize Laureate
 Gabriel García Márquez, Colombian writer
 Cormac McCarthy, American novelist
 H. L. Mencken, American journalist and writer
 Toni Morrison, American writer
 Haruki Murakami, Japanese author and writer
 Edward R. Murrow, American broadcast journalist

N 

 George Jean Nathan, American drama critic and magazine editor

P 

 Christopher Paolini, American writer
 Edgar Allan Poe, American writer, poet, editor, and literary critic
 Ezra Pound, American poet and critic

R 

 James "Scotty" Reston, American journalist
 Anne Rice, American writer
 Dorothy Richardson, writer

S 

 Jean-Paul Sartre, French existentialist philosopher 
 William Shirer, American journalist
 Stephen M. Silverman, American journalist 
 Muriel Spark, Scottish writer
 Susan Swan, Canadian author

T 

 Anne Tyler, American novelist

V 

 Andrew Vachss, American writer and lawyer
 Carl Van Vechten, American writer and photographer

W 

 James D. Watson, writer
 Elinor Wylie, American poet
 Lawrence Wright, American writer and journalist

Z 

 Émile Zola, French writer

References 

Knopf